"The Cold Within" is a poem written in the 1960s by American poet James Patrick Kinney. It has appeared in countless church bulletins, web sites and teaching seminars, as well as magazines and newspapers, including Dear Abby's column on 5 September 1999. His other popular works are A Better world, A poem, A Glimpse of Pioneer ways and Gone Camping (Eulogy to Johny). According to the poet's widow, he submitted the poem first to the Saturday Evening Post, but it was rejected as it was "too controversial for the time". Kinney sent it later to Liguorian, a Catholic magazine, which was the first commercial publication to print it.

According to Timothy Kinney, the poet's son, the poem was originally read at an ecumenical council meeting, after which the ministers, priests and rabbis in attendance requested copies of it. They read the poem to their congregations and, before long, "The Cold Within" became well known throughout the United States after the council meeting of all religions.

Cold within ( introduction) for icse students 

The poem displayed a strong message against racial discrimination, because of which it was called "too controversial for the time" before it reached the heights of fame. The poem is a simple but powerful reminder that if we selfishly hold on world's resources, and the wealth offered by it and we persist in discriminating on grounds of race, religion, caste, gender and ethnicity, we are all lost.

The message James Patrick Kinney gives is that harbouring prejudices against each other will ultimately prove fatal. The poem teaches how in today's generation prejudices, malices, biases, discrimination and racism can destroy human beings and eventually the world. Therefore, the title was given to show that the group lacked the "warmth of humanity" in them and hence they died from "The Cold Within".

References

External links 
James Patrick Kinney's Archive
Interview with Timothy Kinney, James Patrick Kinney's son

American poems
1960s poems